Chicoreus monicae is a species of sea snail, a marine gastropod mollusk in the family Muricidae, the murex snails or rock snails.

Description

Distribution
This marine species occurs off Madagascar.

References

 Bozzetti L. (2001) Chicoreus monicae sp. n. (Gastropoda, Muricidae) dal Madagascar Meridionale. Malacologia Mostra Mondiale 34: 9-10

External links
 MNHN, Paris: holotype

Gastropods described in 2001
Chicoreus